Billel Dziri (born 21 January 1972) is an Algerian football manager, former player and the current head coach of ES Sétif.After starting off with NA Hussein Dey, Dziri played most of his career with USM Alger and had spells with Étoile Sportive du Sahel in Tunisia, CS Sedan Ardennes in France and Al-Sadd in Qatar.

Club career
In 2005 Billel Dziri won the Ballon d'or as the second player from USMA to achieve it, Dziri said I was expecting an individual crown and now that I have it I can only say my immense joy and that the award was the fruit of the efforts Dziri made for years in Algeria or outside the country, The award was received from the hand of the World Cup champion the former French star Laurent Blanc also with a message from Zinedine Zidane. With the end of the 2009–10 season, USM Alger captain Billel Dziri decided to put an end to his football career, which lasted more than 20 years, most of which were spent in USM Alger and his last match was against his former club NA Hussein Dey. And stated yes i confirm this because I have reached the age of 38 years and four months, which is the age that pushes me to retire because it is the right time for me, although i am sure that i can play for at least one or two more seasons.

International career
On September 23, 1992 Billel Dziri played for the first time against Tunisia in friendly match ended in a draw 1–1. In the 1994 African Cup of Nations qualification, Dziri scored his first goal was a brace with the national team against Guinea-Bissau, Dziri participated in the Africa Cup of Nations four times, the first was in 1996 where he played all the matches and scored a goal in the group stage against Burkina Faso, The second participation was in 1998 and a bad participation for Algeria and elimination from the group stage with three defeats and Dziri scored a goal in the last match against Cameroon, The third in 2000 with manager Nacer Sandjak selecting Dziri for his 22-man squad. where Algeria reached the quarter-finals where he played in all the matches and scored one goal against Gabon and it was his last goal in the Africa Cup of Nations, Dziri was selected in the tournament squad with big stars such as Jay-Jay Okocha and Samuel Eto'o. The last participation in the African Cup was in 2002 and Algeria eliminated from the group stage where he played all matches again, bringing the number of matches he played to 14, His last match with the national team was on June 19, 2005 in 2006 FIFA World Cup qualification against Zimbabwe which ended in a draw 2–2, Dziri finished his career with 87 matches and scored 10 goals.

Career statistics

Club

International

International goals
Scores and results list Algeria's goal tally first.

Managerial career
Immediately after his retirement from football, Billel Dziri entered the field of coaching and his beginning in formation was with USM Alger, and his first official assignment was in 2011, after Hervé Renard went and only for two matches, after which he continued to work as an assistant coach in USM Alger and NA Hussein Dey, and in 2015 the same thing was repeated after the dismissal of Hubert Velud where he led USMA temporarily and for only three matches. On June 10, 2015, Dziri was appointed coach of RC Arbaâ in his first experience as head coach. but it did not last long and after three consecutive defeats in the Ligue 1 he was dismissed from his position. A year after that, Dziri spent with WA Boufarik in the Ligue 2 and did not achieve good results and was satisfied with only four victories and was sacked on April 2, and at the end of the season WA Boufarik fell to Third division. On November 11, 2017, Billel Dziri was appointed coach of NA Hussein Dey to succeed Nabil Neghiz who moved to Saudi Arabia, where he achieved positive results and led him to end the season in the podium and a run of 22 matches unbeaten, ensure participation in the CAF Confederation Cup. On November 4, 2018, the two sides agreed to a friendly separation and his last match was against Olympique de Médéa. On November 6, 2018, Dziri was appointed coach of CA Bordj Bou Arreridj succeeding the Spaniard Josep María Nogués until the end of the season and the goal is to play for maintenance.

On June 24, 2019, USM Alger signed with Billel Dziri to be the new coach, the former USM Alger star gave him the power to choose the staff to work with them, Dziri hopes that the club's financial situation will soon be resolved after the latest problems with the Algerian justice of its owner Ali Haddad. On February 26, 2020, USM Alger has announced that it has reached an amicable separation agreement with Dziri, after his insistence on leaving his post, Dziri's departure comes two days after USMA lost in the Algiers Derby, he stated that the team had suffered a lot because of the financial crisis, but after it became close to owning the majority of its shares Groupe SERPORT and to get out of this crisis, it is time to go comfortably on the future of USM Alger. Only a week after his departure Dziri returned to CA Bordj Bou Arreridj. but due to the COVID-19 pandemic in Algeria, the 2019–20 sports season was cancelled. On January 9, 2021, Dziri decided to throw in the towel after his team's heavy defeat in the derby against ES Setif. CA Bordj Bou Arreridj has achieved only two points since the beginning of the season. On January 18, 2021, Billel Dziri returned to NA Hussein Dey to succeed Nabil Leknaoui "I have given my consent in principle to the leadership of NA Hussein Dey," Dziri told Algeria Press Service. "There are still some details to be ironed out before my commitment is formalized. It is on the right track". Only four months later Dziri left his post after agreeing with the management of NA Hussein Dey, les Sang et Or have not won any of the last six meetings.

Managerial statistics

Honours

As a player
USM Alger
 Algerian Ligue Professionnelle 1 (4): 1995–96, 2001–02, 2002–03, 2004–05
 Algerian Cup (5): 1996–97, 1998–99, 2000–01, 2002–03, 2003–04

Étoile Sportive du Sahel
 CAF Super Cup (1): 1998

Al-Sadd SC
 Emir of Qatar Cup (1): 2007
 Qatar Crown Prince Cup (1): 2007

Individual
 Africa Cup of Nations Team of the Tournament: 2000
 Algerian Footballer of the Year: 2005

References

External links
 

1972 births
Living people
Footballers from Algiers
Kabyle people
Algerian footballers
NA Hussein Dey players
USM Alger players
Étoile Sportive du Sahel players
CS Sedan Ardennes players
Al Sadd SC players
Ligue 1 players
Expatriate footballers in Qatar
Expatriate footballers in Tunisia
Expatriate footballers in France
Algerian expatriate footballers
Algerian expatriate sportspeople in Qatar
Algerian expatriate sportspeople in Tunisia
Algerian expatriate sportspeople in France
Qatar Stars League players
Competitors at the 1991 Mediterranean Games
Mediterranean Games competitors for Algeria
Algeria youth international footballers
Algeria under-23 international footballers
Algeria international footballers
1996 African Cup of Nations players
1998 African Cup of Nations players
2000 African Cup of Nations players
2002 African Cup of Nations players
Association football midfielders
Algerian football managers
USM Alger managers
RC Arbaâ managers
WA Boufarik managers
NA Hussein Dey managers
CA Bordj Bou Arréridj managers
21st-century Algerian people